Antti Törmänen (born 28 June 1989) is a professional Go player from Oulu, Finland. He currently lives in Tokyo, Japan.

Biography
Törmänen has stated that he became interested in Go aged 12, after reading the manga Hikaru no Go. He became an insei in Nihon Kiin in fall of 2011.

Achievements
As an amateur player, Törmänen had played in several tournaments with some noteworthy results.
 Fifth place in the World Youth Go Championship 2005.
 Winning the Finnish championships in 2008, 2010 and 2012.
 Winning the London Open Go Congress 2010.
 Winning rapid tournament of the European Go Championship 2011.
 Second place in the European Open Go Championship 2013.

Professional status
In December 2015, it was reported that Törmänen had qualified as a professional player in Japan. He won half of his games at Nihon Ki-in pro exam in fall and was deemed enough to qualify. He was set to debut as professional in April 1, 2016.

References

1989 births
Japanese Go players
Living people
Finnish expatriates in Japan